"Waves" is the debut single by Australian singer and songwriter Dean Lewis. Released in September 2016 as the lead single from his debut extended play Same Kind of Different (2017). 

In an interview with Stack Magazine in May 2017, Lewis explained: "A lot of people think it's about relationships, but it's more about how with every year [that] passes, life gets a little bit less exciting. I was in London a year ago and a few music things were happening, and I'm like 'Why am I not really enjoying my life? Like, this is cool!' Then I remembered when I was 15 and you'd go to a house party and you'd be so excited, or going to the movies with your friends. Where has that feeling gone?"

An acoustic version was released on 3 February 2017.

In March 2019 it was included on Lewis' first full-length album A Place We Knew.

Remixes were released on 26 July 2019.

The song appeared in episode four of series one of Riverdale, episode 10 of series seven of Suits, in episode 12 of series two of Shadowhunters: The Mortal Instruments, the season 1 finale of Magnum P.I. (2018 TV series) and the season 2 premiere of All American.

At the ARIA Music Awards of 2017, the song was nominated for five awards, including Best Pop Release, Breakthrough Artist and Song of the Year.

At the APRA Music Awards of 2018, the song was nominated for two awards; Pop Work of the Year and Most Played Australian Work.

Music video
The music video for "Waves" was directed by Mick Jones and released on 20 October 2016. It was nominated for Best Video at the ARIA Music Awards of 2017.

Track listing

Charts

Weekly charts

Year-end charts

Certifications

Release history

Sheppard version

Australian group Sheppard released a cover on 1 December 2017 as the lead single from their second extended play Undercover. Upon release, Sheppard said "We present to you our cover of "Waves". This was one of our favourite Australian songs of the year and Dean has been a friend of the band for a long time now. Congrats on everything Dean. We hope we’ve done it justice."

References

2016 debut singles
2017 singles
2016 songs
Dean Lewis songs
Island Records singles
Universal Music Australia singles
Songs written by Dean Lewis
Songs written by Nick Atkinson
Songs written by Edd Holloway